Portbraddon Cave (also spelled Portbradden, Portbraddan) is a relict sea cave located near Portbraddon, County Antrim on the north coast of Northern Ireland.

In the 1930s the cave was the subject of an archaeological dig by Andrew McLean May, who made a number of notable finds. Most notably May also discovered partial remains of three human females. They were examined by Professor Thomas Walmsley at Queen's University Belfast, who noted that "most of the bones have primitive features  which are not likely found together in post-medieval time; and there are some characteristics which suggest an epi-palaeolithic inheritance."

The whereabouts of the human bones have since become unknown, and they have not been subjected to modern radiocarbon dating techniques.

See also
 List of caves in the United Kingdom
 List of caves in Ireland

References

Caves of Northern Ireland
Sea caves
Landforms of County Antrim